The following is a list of notable deaths in March 2012.

Entries for each day are listed alphabetically by surname.  A typical entry lists information in the following sequence:
Name, age, country of citizenship and reason for notability, established cause of death, reference (and language of reference, if not English).

March 2012

1
Blagoje Adžić, 79, Serbian politician. 
Eddie Allen, 93, American football player.
Phillip R. Allen, 72, American actor (Star Trek III: The Search for Spock, The Bad News Bears).
Alice Arden, 97, American Olympic (1936) high jumper.
Henryk Bałuszyński, 39, Polish footballer, heart attack. 
Luigi Bazzoni, 82, Italian film director (Pride and Vengeance, The Fifth Cord).
Andrew Breitbart, 43, American publisher and political commentator, heart attack.
Jerome Courtland, 85, American actor, director, and producer (Escape to Witch Mountain, Tokyo Joe), heart disease.
Lucio Dalla, 68, Italian singer-songwriter and musician, heart attack.
Jack Fouts, 86, American football player and coach.
Peter Graeme, 90, British oboist.
Paul Hürlimann, 78, Swiss Olympic equestrian.
Fathulla Jameel, 69, Maldivian politician, Minister of Foreign Affairs (1978–2005), heart disease.
9th Jebtsundamba Khutughtu, 80, Tibetan-born Mongolian Buddhist spiritual leader.
Archie Kalokerinos, 85, Greek-Australian physician.
Thomas J. Lydon, 84, American federal judge, sepsis and car accident complications.
Altamir Heitor Martins, 32, Brazilian footballer (BEC Tero Sasana F.C.).
Gemma McCluskie, 29, British actress (EastEnders), blunt force trauma.
Germano Mosconi, 79, Italian sportswriter and news presenter. 
Callan Pinckney, 72, American fitness professional, created Callanetics.
Randy Primas, 62, American politician, Mayor of Camden, New Jersey (1981–1990), bone marrow cancer.
Conrad Soares, 72, Bermudan Olympic sailor.

2
Lawrence Anthony, 61, South African conservationist and environmentalist, heart attack.
Van T. Barfoot, 92, American soldier, Medal of Honor recipient, head injuries from a fall.
Gerry Bridgwood, 67, English footballer (Stoke City), heart attack.
Nydia Ecury, 86, Aruban-Dutch writer, translator and actress, Alzheimer's disease.
George Firestone, 80, American politician, Secretary of State of Florida (1978–1987), Alzheimer's disease.
Doug Furnas, 52, American professional wrestler, heart disease.
Vera Galushka-Duyunova, 66, Russian volleyball player, cardiac arrest.
Brajamohan Jamatia, 106, Indian politician.
Sir Keith Jones, 100, Australian medical practitioner and surgeon.
Gary Kubly, 68, American politician, Minnesota State Senator (since 2002), amyotrophic lateral sclerosis.
Rui Maia, 86, Portuguese Olympian 
José Adolfo Mojica Morales, 75, Salvadoran Roman Catholic prelate, Bishop of Sonsonate (1989–2011).
John Panelli, 85, American football player (Detroit Lions, Chicago Cardinals).
Gérard Rinaldi, 69, French actor and singer (Les Charlots), lymphoma.
Norman St John-Stevas, Baron St John of Fawsley, 82, British politician and author, Leader of the House of Commons (1979–1981).
Stan Stearns, 76, American photographer (John F. Kennedy, Jr. salute), lung cancer.
Frits Wijngaard, 85, Dutch Olympic boxer.
James Q. Wilson, 80, American political scientist, co-author of the broken windows theory, leukemia.
Isagani Yambot, 77, Filipino journalist, publisher of the Philippine Daily Inquirer (since 1994), heart attack.

3
Fritz Baier, 88, German politician.
Viv Bingham, 79, British political activist.
Irvin Borish, 99, American optometrist.
Steve Bridges, 48, American impressionist (George W. Bush), anaphylaxis.
Dave Charnley, 76, British former European lightweight champion boxer.
Leonardo Cimino, 94, American actor (Moonstruck, Dune, Hudson Hawk), COPD.
Mike Darby, 69, Australian football player.
*A R Shamsud Doha, 83, Bangladeshi politician, Minister of Foreign Affairs (1982–1984).
Henryk Grabowski, 82, Polish Olympic athlete.
Anthony Grainger, 36, English police victim, shot.
Lloyd Hittle, 88, American baseball player (Washington Senators).
Per J. Husabø, 83, Norwegian politician. 
Lutfullah Khan, 95, Pakistani writer and sound archivist.
Franklin McMahon, 90, American artist and reporter.
Ralph McQuarrie, 82, American conceptual designer and illustrator (Star Wars, Cocoon, Raiders of the Lost Ark), Oscar winner (1986).
Frank Marocco, 81, American accordionist, arranger and composer.
Ronnie Montrose, 64, American guitarist (Montrose), suicide.
Jim Obradovich, 62, American baseball player (Houston Astros).
Norris Stevenson, 72, American football player (Dallas Cowboys, Edmonton Eskimos, BC Lions), cancer.
Kason Sugioka, 98, Japanese calligrapher, Order of Culture recipient, heart failure.
Alex Webster, 80, American football player (New York Giants, Montreal Alouettes) and coach (New York Giants).

4
Ali Ahmed Abdi, 26, Somali journalist, shot.
Maurice De Muer, 90, French cyclist and sports director.
Christopher Joseph Earl, 86, British neurologist.
Felícia Fuster, 91, Spanish Catalan painter and poet. 
William E. Galbraith, 86, American businessman.
Robert Brendon Keating, 87, American diplomat, Ambassador to Madagascar and the Comoros (1983–1986), pneumonia.
Paul McBride, 46, British lawyer.
Pete McCaffrey, 74, American Olympic gold medal-winning (1964) basketball player.
Don Mincher, 73, American baseball player (Minnesota Twins, California Angels, Oakland Athletics), President of the Southern League (2000–2011).
Runako Morton, 33, Nevisian Test cricketer (West Indies), traffic collision.
John C. Reiss, 89, American Roman Catholic prelate, Bishop of Trenton (1980–1997).
Shmuel Tankus, 97, Israeli naval officer, fifth commander of the Navy.
Joan Taylor, 82, American actress (Earth vs. the Flying Saucers, The Rifleman), natural causes.

5
Don Andrews, 82, Australian guitarist.
Yehuda Ben-Haim, 56, Israeli Olympic boxer. 
Jörg Balke, 75, German Olympic athlete.
Sobha Brahma, 82, Indian painter and sculptor.
Willard Cochrane, 97, American agricultural economist.
Rafael Corporán de los Santos, 71, Dominican television producer, host, and politician, Mayor of Distrito Nacional (1990–1994), heart attack.
Fernando Da Silva, 91, American painter.
Bill Green, 50, American sprinter, cancer.
Paul Haines, 41, New Zealand writer, cancer.
Zahir Howaida, 67, Afghan singer.
William Heirens, 83, American serial killer.
Rushworth Kidder, 67, American ethicist and writer, natural causes.
Godwin Kotey, 46–47,  Ghanaian actor, producer, educator, playwright and director, leukemia.
Marian Kuszewski, 78, Polish Olympic silver medal-winning (1956, 1960) fencer. 
Roland Lakes, 72, American football player (San Francisco 49ers, New York Giants).
Philip Madoc, 77, Welsh actor (Dad's Army, The Life and Times of David Lloyd George).
Maurice Pechet, 94, American academic.
Ken Shipp, 83, American football coach.
William O. Wooldridge, 89, American army officer.

6
Marcos Alonso, 78, Spanish football player (Real Madrid).
Francisco Xavier do Amaral, 75, East Timorese politician, President (1975).
Jaap Boersma, 82, Dutch politician, Minister of Social Affairs (1971–1977), Minister of Agriculture and Fisheries (1973).
William Denis Brown III, 80, American lawyer and businessman, Alzheimer's disease.
Jan Dawidziuk, 74, Polish-born American bishop of the Polish National Catholic Church.
Antonio Garzya, 85, Italian professor.
Lucia Mannucci, 91, Italian singer. 
Maurice Moyer, 93, American clergyman and civil rights leader.
Donald M. Payne, 77, American politician, U.S. Representative from New Jersey (since 1989), colon cancer.
Frederick M. Reed, 87, American politician, Attorney General of Vermont (1957–1960).
Robert B. Sherman, 86, American songwriter and composer (Mary Poppins, The Many Adventures of Winnie the Pooh, Chitty Chitty Bang Bang), Oscar winner (1965).
Nejiko Suwa, 92, Japanese violinist.
Arthur A. Vogel, 88, American bishop of the Episcopal Diocese of West Missouri.
Helen Walulik, 82, American baseball player (All-American Girls Professional Baseball League).
Sayuri Yamauchi, 55, Japanese voice actress (Mobile Suit Gundam Wing, Crayon Shin-chan), cancer.

7
Jeanne Achterberg, 69, American psychologist, breast cancer.
Cris Alexander, 92, American actor and photographer.
Gary DeCramer, 67, American politician, Minnesota state senator (1983–1993).
Tony Drake, 89, English hiker.
Harold K. Forsen, 79, American nuclear engineer.
Gherardo Gnoli, 74, Italian historian.
Dave Hrechkosy, 60, Canadian ice hockey player (California Golden Seals, St. Louis Blues), brain cancer.
Sir Raymond Lygo, 87, British admiral and businessman.
Félicien Marceau, 98, French novelist, member of the Académie française. 
Marcel Mouchel, 85, French footballer and manager. 
Greg Novak, 61, American writer and wargame designer.
Big Walter Price, 97, American blues singer, songwriter and pianist.
Włodzimierz Smolarek, 54, Polish footballer.
Pierre Tornade, 82, French actor. 
Ramaz Urushadze, 72, Georgian footballer. 
Aníbal Villacís, 85, Ecuadorian painter.

8
Corinna Adam, 75, British journalist, homefire.
Kristin Bølgen Bronebakk, 61, Norwegian civil servant.
LaVerne Carter, 86, American bowler, heart failure.
S. Henry Cho, 77, Korean martial arts instructor.
Pat Claridge, 73, Canadian football player, Alzheimer's disease.
Leslie Cochran, 60, American street personality, activist, and politician, head trauma.
Simin Daneshvar, 90, Iranian academic, novelist, fiction writer and translator.
Ursula Dronke, 91, British medievalist.
Mike Fetchick, 89, American golfer.
Compton Gonsalves, 85, Trinidad and Tobago Olympic cyclist.
Bugs Henderson, 68, American blues guitarist, cancer.
Charlie Hoag, 81, American Olympic gold medal-winning basketball player (1952).
Scott Huey, 88, Northern Irish cricketer.
Elena Libera, 94 or 95, Italian Olympic (1948) fencer. 
Minoru Mori, 77, Japanese businessperson, chairman and executive director of the Mori Building Company, founder of the Mori Art Museum, heart failure. 
Elio Pagliarani, 84, Italian poet and literary critic.
Jens Petersen, 70, Danish footballer and manager. 
Steve Romeo, 40, American ski mountaineer, avalanche.
Steven Rubenstein, 49, American anthropologist. (body discovered on this date)
Mick Walker, 69, British motorcycling writer.

9
Peter Bergman, 72, American comedian (The Firesign Theater), leukemia.
Dennis Bowen, 61, American actor (Caddyshack II; Welcome Back, Kotter).
Brian Bromley, 65, English footballer (Bolton Wanderers, Portsmouth).
Herb Carnegie, 92, Canadian ice hockey player.
Anton Crișan, 70, Romanian ice hockey player.
Harry Dagnall, 97, British philatelist.
Willye Dennis, 85, American civil rights activist and politician, member of the Florida House of Representatives (1992–1999).
Fotis Mavriplis, 92, Greek Olympic skier.
John Holt, 82, Australian politician, member of the New South Wales Legislative Council (1972–1984).
Thomas Locker, 74, American author and painter.
Joy Mukherjee, 73, Indian actor.
*Zuhir al-Qaisi, 49, Palestinian militant leader, Secretary General of the Popular Resistance Committees (since 2011), air strike.
Selma Rubin, 96, American activist and environmentalist.
Jose Tomas Sanchez, 91, Filipino Roman Catholic prelate, Cardinal Priest of San Pio V a Villa Carpegna (1991–2012).
Terry Teene, 70, American singer and clown, injuries from a traffic collision.
Bill Wedderburn, Baron Wedderburn of Charlton, 84, British academic and politician.
Harry Wendelstedt, 73, American baseball umpire (1966–1998), brain tumor.
*Widjojo Nitisastro, 84, Indonesian economist and government minister.

10
Sukumar Barman, 60, Indian politician.
George Beattie, Scottish footballer.
Bert R. Bulkin, 82, American aeronautical engineer. 
Dorrit Cohn, 87, American academic.
Wim De Smet, 79, Flemish zoologist.
Amina El Filali, 16, Moroccan rape victim, suicide by poisoning.
Elmer L. Gaden, 88, American biochemist.
Jean Giraud, 73, French comic book artist (Blueberry, Métal Hurlant) and film production designer (Tron, Alien), cancer.
Julio César González, 35, Mexican Olympic boxer and former world light heavyweight champion, injuries from a hit and run.
Robert A. Howie, 88, English petrologist.
Jay McMullen, 90, American journalist (CBS News).
*Hermín Negrón Santana, 74, Puerto Rican Roman Catholic prelate, Auxiliary Bishop of San Juan de Puerto Rico (since 1981).
R. I. Page, 87, British historian and runologist.
Mykola Plaviuk, 86, Ukrainian politician, last President of the Ukrainian People's Republic in exile (1989–1992). 
Uttamrao Deorao Patil, 67, Indian politician.
*Frank Sherwood Rowland, 84, American chemistry professor, Nobel laureate in Chemistry (1995), Parkinson's disease.
Domna Samiou, 83, Greek singer and traditional music researcher.
Tony Silipo, 54, Canadian politician, Ontario Minister of Education (1991–1993) and MPP for Dovercourt (1990–1999), brain tumor. 
Jammu Siltavuori, 85, Finnish murderer and sex offender. 
Ruth-Marie Stewart, 84, American Olympic skier.
John G. Taylor, 80, British physicist.
Tan Boon Teik, 83, Singaporean lawyer, Attorney-General (1967–1992), internal bleeding.
Jack Watson, 90, English cricketer, football coach and scout.
Richard White, 86, New Zealand rugby union player.
Ethel Winter, 87, American dancer with the Martha Graham Dance Company and teacher at the Juilliard School.
Nick Zoricic, 29, Canadian ski cross racer, brain injuries from race crash.

11
Henry Adefope, 85, Nigerian politician, Foreign Minister (1978–1979).
Hub Andrews, 89, American baseball player (New York Giants).
Gian Nicola Babini, 67, Italian scientist.
Faith Brook, 90, British actress.
Sid Couchey, 92, American comic book artist (Richie Rich, Little Lotta, Little Dot), Burkitt's lymphoma.
Alba Encarnación, 56, Puerto Rican activist and teacher. 
Wayne Frazier, 73, American football player (Kansas City Chiefs).
Hans G. Helms, 79, German experimental writer.
Philip Jenkinson, 76, English television presenter.
María Teresa López Beltrán, 61, Spanish medievalist and academic (University of Málaga).
Tom Manastersky, 83, Canadian football player (Montreal Alouettes, Saskatchewan Roughriders) and hockey player (Montreal Canadiens).
Bogusław Mec, 65, Polish singer, songwriter, composer, and artist.
James B. Morehead, 95, American World War II flying ace, stroke complications.
Noverre, 14, American Thoroughbred racehorse, winner of the Sussex Stakes (2001). (death announced on this date)
Lanier W. Phillips, 88, American civil rights activist.
Gösta Schwarck, 96, Danish composer and businessman. 
John Souza, 91, American soccer player (1950 World Cup, 1948 and 1952 Olympics).
Leon Spencer, 66, American jazz organist.
Ghiath Tayfour, 42 or 43, Syrian boxing champion, shot.
Ian Turpie, 68, Australian actor and game show host, throat cancer.
Miomir Vukobratović, 81, Serbian mechanical engineer.
Tahira Wasti, 68, Pakistani actor.

12
Mark Aguhar, 24, American activist, writer and multimedia fine artist, suicide.
Niels Baunsøe, 72, Danish Olympic cyclist.
Robert Parke Cameron, 91, Canadian diplomat.
Samuel Glazer, 89, American entrepreneur and businessman, co-developer of Mr. Coffee, leukemia.
Junus Effendi Habibie, 74, Indonesian diplomat.
Dick Harter, 81, American basketball coach (Charlotte Hornets, University of Oregon), cancer.
Michael Hossack, 65, American drummer (The Doobie Brothers), cancer.
Friedhelm Konietzka, 73, German-born Swiss football player and manager, assisted suicide.
Erling Stuer Lauridsen, 95, Danish Olympic wrestler.
Augustin Misago, 69, Rwandan Roman Catholic prelate, Bishop of Gikongoro (since 1992).
*Wilson Abraham Moncayo Jalil, 67, Ecuadorian Roman Catholic prelate, Bishop of Santo Domingo en Ecuador (since 2002).
Tom Murrin, 73, American performance artist and playwright.
Madeleine Parent, 93, Canadian union leader and women's rights activist.
Jean-Pierre Salignon, 84, French Olympic basketball player.
Douglas Scott, 91, Australian politician, member of the Australian Senate (1970, 1974–1985).

13
Vernon Ahmadjian, 81, American lichenologist.
Abdullah al-Dahdouh, 45–46, Moroccan Muslim, murdered.
Keith Bannister, 89, English footballer.
Michael P. Barnett, 82, British theoretical chemist and computer scientist.
Bengt Beckman, 86, Swedish mathematician.
Derek Bridge, 90, English cricketer.
Harvey T. Carter, 83, American rock climber.
Domitila Chúngara, 74, Bolivian labor leader and feminist, lung cancer.
Bodjie Dasig, 48, Filipino singer and songwriter, cancer.
Della Davidson, 60–61, American modern dancer, choreographer, and dance professor, breast cancer.
Julius Depaoli, 88, Austrian Olympic water polo player.
Michel Duchaussoy, 73, French actor, cardiac arrest. 
Jock Hobbs, 52, New Zealand rugby union player and administrator, leukaemia.
Frank Jordan, 79, Australian Olympic (1952) water polo player.
Tom Johnson, 89, American astronomer and businessman, founder of Celestron.
Noel Luces, 63, Trinidadian Olympic (1968) cyclist, stroke.
Hans Ludvig Martensen, 84, Danish Roman Catholic prelate, Bishop of Copenhagen (1965–1995).
Eileen McDonough, 49, American child actress (The Mary Tyler Moore Show, The Waltons).
Grete Nordrå, 87, Norwegian actress. 
Karl Roy, 43, Filipino singer (Kapatid, P.O.T.), cardiac arrest.
Lyudmila Shagalova, 88, Russian film actress (The Young Guard, Balzaminov's Marriage). 
Amusa Shittu, 75, Nigerian footballer, effects of a stroke.
Jacques Villiers, 87, French aerospace engineer.

14
 Gretl Aicher, 84, Austrian artistic director. 
Ray Barlow, 85, English footballer (West Bromwich Albion).
Vladimir Buslaev, 74, Russian mathematical physicist.
Valentīna Butāne, 82, Latvian singer.
Matthew G. Carter, 98, American politician and housing activist, Mayor of Montclair, New Jersey (1968–1972), Alzheimer's disease.
Josie DeCarlo, 88, French model, inspiration for Josie of Josie and the Pussycats.
Kihachi Enomoto, 75, Japanese baseball player, colon cancer.
Himanish Goswami, 85, Indian writer and cartoonist, prostate cancer.
Ernst-Günter Habig, 76, German Olympic footballer, stroke.
Eddie King, 73, American Chicago blues musician.
Carl Rattray, 82, Jamaican jurist and politician, Attorney General (1989–1993) and president of the Court of Appeal (1993–1999).
George Reynolds, 83, Australian racing driver. (death announced on this date)
Marcel Rohrbach, 78, French cyclist.
Pierre Schoendoerffer, 83, French director (The Anderson Platoon), surgical complications.
Margareta Sjöstedt, 88,  Swedish-born Austrian singer and actress.
Ted L. Strickland, 79, American politician, Lieutenant Governor of Colorado (1973–1975).
Ċensu Tabone, 98, Maltese politician, President (1989–1994) and Minister for Foreign Affairs (1987–1989).

15
Alice Amsden, 68, American economist and MIT professor.
Edvard Hagerup Bull, 89, Norwegian composer.
Abel Chennouf, 25, French soldier, shot.
Mervyn Davies, 65, Welsh rugby union player, cancer.
Bob Day, 67, American Olympic (1968) distance runner, bladder cancer.
Baby Falak, 2, Indian baby, cardiac arrest.
Eb Gaines, 84, American businessman and diplomat, Consul General to Bermuda (1989–1992).
Lily Garafulic, 97, Chilean sculptor and professor.
Luis Gonzales, 81, Filipino actor, pneumonia.
Bernardino González Ruíz, 101, Panamanian politician, President (1963).
Fran Matera, 87, American comic strip artist (Steve Roper and Mike Nomad).
Nigel Napier, 14th Lord Napier, 81, British soldier and courtier.
Dave Philley, 91, American baseball player (Baltimore Orioles, Chicago White Sox, Philadelphia Athletics).
Pepe Rubio, 80, Spanish actor.
Jean-Marie Souriau, 89, French mathematician.
Joe Stanley, 104, American World War II pilot, commander of Eglin Air Force Base.

16
Aziz Ab'Sáber, 87, Brazilian geologist, heart attack.
Georges Aber, 81, French singer-songwriter.
Alexander of Liechtenstein, 82, Liechtenstein royal.
Lee Balterman, 91, American photographer.
M. A. R. Barker, 83, American professor, fantasy novelist, and role-playing game creator.
Estanislau Basora, 85, Spanish footballer.
John Billman, 92, American football player (Minnesota Gophers, Brooklyn Dodgers, Chicago Rockets).
Bijan Choudhury, 80–81, Indian painter.
Giancarlo Cobelli, 82, Italian actor and stage director. 
Ed Dahler, 86, American basketball player.
Ray Gariepy, 83, Canadian ice hockey player (Boston Bruins, Toronto Maple Leafs).
John Ghindia, 86, American football player (University of Michigan).
Robert Hails, 89, American air force lieutenant general, vice commander of Tactical Air Command.
Robert L. Hall, 85, American anthropologist, authority on Native American culture, complications from carcinoid cancer.
Donald E. Hillman, 93, American World War II flying ace.
Irvin Iffla, 88, Jamaican cricketer.
Eldon Nelson, 85, American jockey.
Bronislav Poloczek, 72, Czech theatre and television actor. 
*Peter Serracino Inglott, 75, Maltese philosopher.
Anita Steckel, 82, American feminist artist.
Takaaki Yoshimoto, 87, Japanese poet, critic, and professor (Tokyo Institute of Technology), pneumonia.
Dieter Zechlin, 85, German pianist.

17
Patience Abbe, 87, American children's author.
Paul Boyer, 76, American historian.
Rubí Cerioni, 84, Argentine footballer.
Bernard Cohen, 87, American nuclear physicist.
Matt Conte, 85, American football player and coach.
John Cowles, Jr., 82, American businessman and philanthropist, lung cancer.
Bert Demarco, 87, Scottish snooker player and billiard hall owner, stroke.
John Demjanjuk, 91, Ukrainian Nazi war criminal, natural causes.
René Fontaine, 78, Canadian politician, Minister of Northern Development (1987–1990).
John T. Henley, 90, American politician, President pro tempore of the North Carolina Senate (1975–1978).
Famara Jatta, 53, Gambian government minister and economist, Governor of the Central Bank (2003–2007).
Jaye Radisich, 35, Australian politician, Western Australian MLA for Swan Hills (2001–2008), cancer.
Pope Shenouda III of Alexandria, 88, Egyptian Pope of the Coptic Orthodox Church of Alexandria (since 1971), prostate cancer.
Ron Stewart, 79, Canadian ice hockey player.
Ngaire Thomas, 69, New Zealand author. 
Margaret Whitlam, 92, Australian swimmer and activist, wife of Gough Whitlam, complications from a fall.
Chaleo Yoovidhya, 88, Thai businessman (Red Bull), natural causes.
Fakhra Younus, 33, Pakistani acid attack victim, suicide by jumping.

18
Imra Agotić, 69, Croatian major general, commander of the Air Force.
Khelifi Ahmed, 90–91, Algerian singer.
Haim Alexander, 96, German-born Israeli composer.
Furman Bisher, 93, American sports writer (The Atlanta Journal-Constitution), heart attack.
 William R. Charette, 79, American Medal of Honor recipient.
Shirley May France, 79, American swimmer.
António Leitão, 51, Portuguese Olympic bronze medal-winning (1984) athlete, iron overload. 
Bob McConnell, 87, American baseball author and researcher, founding member of Society for American Baseball Research.
William G. Moore Jr., 91, American Air Force general.
Alan Pegler, 91, British railway preservationist.
Claudia Pía Baudracco, 41, Argentine women, sexual minorities and LGTBI rights activist.
Anargyros Printezis, 74, Greek Eastern Catholic hierarch, Apostolic Exarch of Greece (1975–2008).
Nigel Rusted, 104, Canadian physician.
István Suti, 72, Hungarian Olympic equestrian.
George Tupou V, 63, Tongan King (since 2006).
Eric Watson, 56, British photographer, heart attack.
Jalal Zolfonun, 74, Iranian setar player and composer, heart disease.

19
Verica Barać, 56, Serbian lawyer, cancer.
Dante Benvenuti, 86, Argentine Olympic cyclist.
Hanne Borchsenius, 76, Danish actress.
Jim Case, 84, American television director and producer.
Jagbir Singh Chhina, 92, Indian freedom fighter.
Gene DeWeese, 78, American author.
Donald Brown Engley, 94, American librarian.
Ulu Grosbard, 83, Belgian-born American theatre and film director (The Subject Was Roses, American Buffalo).
William J. Hibbler, 65, American federal judge, District Judge for the United States District Court for the Northern District of Illinois (since 1999).
Anton Jude, 51, Sri Lankan actor, cardiac arrest.
Sanford N. McDonnell, 89, American businessman (McDonnell Douglas), pancreatic cancer.
Paul Peter Mostoway, 81, Canadian politician.
Hugo Munthe-Kaas, 90, Norwegian resistance fighter and politician.
Karl-Heinz Spickenagel, 80, German footballer. 
George Topolnisky, 95, Canadian politician.
Knut Erik Tranøy, 93, Norwegian philosopher.

20
Erlom Akhvlediani, 78, Georgian writer.
Guy Boucher, 68, French Canadian actor, singer and radio and TV presenter.
Daishin Noboru, 74, Japanese sumo wrestler.
Ottorino Enzo, 85, Italian rower.
Bill Glasson, 87, Australian politician, member of the Queensland Legislative Assembly for Gregory (1974–1989).
Lincoln Hall, 56, Australian mountaineer and author, mesothelioma.
Ralph P. Hummel, 74, American political scientist.
 Noboru Ishiguro, 73, Japanese animator and animation director (Space Battleship Yamato, The Super Dimension Fortress Macross, Megazone 23).
Ante Jurić, 89, Croatian Roman Catholic prelate, Metropolitan Archbishop of Split and Makarska (1988–2000).
Abdul Rahman Orfalli, 23, Syrian protest organizer, bombing.
Mel Parnell, 89, American baseball player (Boston Red Sox), cancer.
 Frits de Ruijter, 94, Dutch Olympic athlete. 
 Chaim Pinchas Scheinberg, 101, Polish-born Israeli Haredi rabbi and rosh yeshiva.
 Jim Stynes, 45, Irish-born Australian football player, cancer.
Allen Tolmich, 93, American athlete, Amateur Athletic Union hurdle champion (1937, 1939, 1940, 1941).
 Bernard Zadi Zaourou, 73, Ivorian politician and author, heart complications.

21
Shaima Alawadi, 32, American murder victim, head trauma.
Lacy Banks, 68, American sports columnist (Chicago Sun-Times) and author, heart disease.
Rekia Boyd, 22, American police victim, shot.
Christine Brooke-Rose, 89, British writer and literary critic.
John George Chedid, 88, Lebanese-born American Maronite hierarch, first Bishop of Our Lady of Los Angeles (1994–2000).
Albrecht Dietz, 86, German entrepreneur and scientist. 
Judy Egerton, 83, Australian-born British art historian and curator.
Ron Erhardt, 81, American football coach (New England Patriots, New York Giants, New York Jets).
Elisabeth Ettlinger, 96, German-born Swiss archaeologist and academic.
Robert Fuest, 84, English film director.
Bruno Giacometti, 104, Swiss architect, brother of Alberto and Diego Giacometti.
Tonino Guerra, 92, Italian poet and screenwriter (L'Avventura, Blowup, Amarcord).
Irving Louis Horowitz, 82, American sociologist (Rutgers University, Washington University), surgical complications.
Mohamed Kassas, 91, Egyptian botanist and environmentalist.
Murray Lender, 81, American entrepreneur (Lender's Bagels), complications from a fall.
José Matanhy de Saldanha, 63, Indian politician and social activist, heart attack.
Yuri Razuvaev, 66, Russian chess player and trainer.
Marina Salye, 77, Russian geologist and politician, heart attack. 
Shao Xianghua, 99, Chinese scientist. 
Derick Thomson, 90, Scottish poet.
Kåre Tveter, 90, Norwegian painter and illustrator.

22
Joe Blanchard, 83, American football player (Edmonton Eskimos), professional wrestler and promoter, squamous-cell carcinoma.
C. K. Chandrappan, 76, Indian politician, Secretary of the Communist Party of India (Kerala), member of the Lok Sabha (1977–1980; 2004–2010), cancer.
Samuel Collins, 88, American politician.
Ted Cutting, 85, British automotive engineer, designed Aston Martin DBR1.
Dhaval Dhairyawan, 32, Indian photographer, after a long illness.
Hernán Elizondo Arce, 90, Costa Rican novelist and poet.
Demir Gökgöl, 74, Turkish-born German actor. 
Harry Gunnarsson, 82, Swedish Olympic boxer.
Johnny McCauley, 86, Irish singer-songwriter.
Vimal Mundada, 49, Indian politician, cancer.
Nagnath Naikwadi, 89, Indian independence activist and social worker.
Jackson Narcomey, 70, American painter.
Muhammad Ibrahim Nugud, 80, Sudanese politician, Secretary General of the Sudanese Communist Party (since 1971).
Kirsten Passer, 82, Danish actress. 
John Payton, 65, American civil rights attorney (Gratz v. Bollinger).
Matthew White Ridley, 4th Viscount Ridley, 86, British nobleman.
Edward Sismore, 90, British RAF officer (Air Commodore) and Distinguished Flying Cross recipient.
Mickey Sullivan, 80, American baseball coach.
David Waltz, 68, American computer scientist.
Neil L. Whitehead, 56, English anthropologist.

23
Abdullahi Yusuf Ahmed, 77, Somali politician, President (2004–2008), liver failure.
Chico Anysio, 80, Brazilian comedian, renal and pulmonary failure.
Jean-Yves Besselat, 68, French politician.
Harold Blitman, 82, American basketball coach.
Jim Duffy, 75, American animator (Rugrats, The Smurfs), cancer.
Jack Ellena, 80, American football player.
Hynek Hromada, 76, Czech sports shooter.
Witold Lesiewicz, 89, Polish film director. 
Eric Lowen, 60, American singer and songwriter ("We Belong", "Everything I Wanted"), complications from ALS.
Péter Pázmándy, 73, Hungarian-born Swiss footballer and coach.
Naji Talib, 94, Iraqi politician, Prime Minister (1966–1967).
Lonnie Wright, 68, American football (Denver Broncos) and basketball (Denver Rockets) player, heart failure.

24
Iqbal Bahu, 68, Pakistani singer, cardiac arrest.
Dennis Bennett, 72, American baseball player (Philadelphia Phillies, Boston Red Sox).
Vigor Bovolenta, 37, Italian Olympic silver medal-winning (1996) volleyball player, heart attack.
Sir Paul Callaghan, 64, New Zealand physicist, colon cancer.
Henry Clark, 82, Northern Irish politician, MP for Antrim, North (1959–1970).
Bill Cutler, 92, American baseball executive.
Hertha Engelbrecht, 89, German lawyer.
Pierre Gérald, 105, French actor.
Vince Lovegrove, 65, Australian musician and journalist, car accident.
Marion Marlowe, 83, American singer and stage actress, natural causes.
Edward Henryk Materski, 89, Polish Roman Catholic prelate, Bishop of Radom (1992–1999). 
Nick Noble, 85, American pop and country singer ("The Tip of My Fingers", "Moonlight Swim").
Jose Prakash, 86, Indian actor, heart failure.
Wolfgang Rennert, 89, German conductor.
Jocky Wilson, 62, Scottish darts player.

25
Raymond Bley, 73, Luxembourgish Olympic cyclist.
Priscilla Buckley, 90, American writer, managing editor of National Review, sister of William F. Buckley, Jr.
Hal E. Chester, 91, American film producer and former child actor.
John Crosfield, 96, British businessman.
Bob DeCourcy, 84, Canadian ice hockey player (New York Rangers).
Tony Gordon, 63, New Zealand rugby league player and coach.
Edd Gould, 23, British animator and creator of Eddsworld, leukemia.
Russell C. Jordan Jr., 85, American politician.
Mona Shourie Kapoor, 48, Indian television producer, cancer.
Ben-Zion Leitner, 85, Israeli soldier, Medal of Valor recipient.
 Lex, 12, American Marine service dog, awarded honorary Purple Heart, cancer.
Tom Lodge, 75, British radio DJ, cancer.
Ralph Maxwell, 78, New Zealand politician, MP for Waitakere (1978–1984) and Titirangi (1984–1990).
Roger Molander, 71, American anti-nuclear activist, complications from liver cancer.
Tony Newton, Baron Newton of Braintree, 74, British politician, Leader of the House of Commons (1992–1997), MP for Braintree (1974–1997).
Nathalie Perrey, 83, French actress. 
Larry Stevenson, 81, American skateboard innovator, pneumonia and Alzheimer's disease.
Bertil Ströberg, 79, Swedish Air Force officer and spy, cancer.
Bert Sugar, 74, American boxing writer and historian, cardiac arrest.
Antonio Tabucchi, 68, Italian novelist (Indian Nocturne, Pereira Maintains).
Bill Weston, 70, British stunt performer (Saving Private Ryan, Raiders of the Lost Ark, Titanic).
Achim Wunderlich, 88, German army officer, awarded Knight's Cross of the Iron Cross.

26
Susana Agüero, 67–68, Argentine ballet dancer.
Sisto Averno, 86, American football player (Baltimore Colts).
Michael Begley, 79, Irish politician, TD for Kerry South (1969–1989).
Thomas M. Cover, 73, American information theorist.
David Craighead, 88, American organist.
Manik Sitaram Godghate, 74, Indian poet.
Jay Holt, 88, American Olympic wrestler.
Edmond Jacobs, 83, Luxembourgish cyclist.
Helmer Ringgren, 94, Swedish theologian.
Stella Tanner, 87, British actress.

27
Dale Baker, 73, Australian politician, South Australian MHA for MacKillop (1985–1997); Leader of the Opposition (1990–1992), motor neurone disease.
Sohen Biln, 72, Canadian Olympic rower. 
Hugo Biermann, 95, South African admiral.
Roger Cooke, 71, American artist and muralist.
Millôr Fernandes, 87, Brazilian cartoonist, humorist, and playwright, multiple organ failure. 
Ademilde Fonseca, 91, Brazilian Choro singer.
Marc Gervais, 82, Canadian Jesuit, writer, and film professor, complications of dementia.
Larry Haws, 72, American politician, member of the Minnesota House of Representatives (2006–2010), brain cancer.
Harold G. Hillam, 77, American leader in the Church of Jesus Christ of Latter-day Saints.
Anatoly Kikin, 71, Soviet and Russian footballer and coach.
Hilton Kramer, 84, American art critic, co-founder of The New Criterion.
Adrienne Rich, 82, American feminist poet and essayist, complications of rheumatoid arthritis.
Warren Stevens, 92, American actor (Forbidden Planet, The Barefoot Contessa), lung disease.
Micah True, 58, American ultramarathon runner.
Garry Walberg, 90, American actor (Quincy, M.E., The Odd Couple), COPD and heart failure.
Daniel Zamudio, 24, Chilean homosexual, beaten.
Alim Zankishiev, 30, Russian insurgent, leader in the Caucasus Emirate, killed.

28
Fred Anderson, 78, Australian rugby league player.
John Arden, 81, English playwright.
Alexander Arutiunian, 91, Armenian composer.
Etel Billig, 79, American actress, brain aneurysm.
Leonard Braithwaite, 88, Canadian lawyer and politician.
Walker Calhoun, 93, Cherokee musician, dancer, and teacher.
Jacques Carelman, 83, French painter, illustrator and designer. 
Harry Crews, 76, American author, neuropathy.
T. Damodaran, 77, Indian screenwriter.
Ruth M. Davis, 83, American computer scientist and civil servant.
Hans van den Doel, 74, Dutch economist and politician, Member of the House of Representatives (1967–1973). 
Joy G. Dryfoos, 86, American sociologist, cardiac arrest.
Alberto María Fonrouge, 99, Argentine politician and lawyer.
Jerry McCain, 81, American blues musician.
Willie May, 75, American Olympic hurdle medalist (1960), amyloidosis.
Erkki Nordberg, 65, Finnish colonel and war correspondent.
Brian Phillips, 80, English footballer (Mansfield Town).
William Sampson, 52, Canadian author, heart attack.
Earl Scruggs, 88, American bluegrass musician, natural causes.
Sergei Solnechnikov, 31, Russian military officer, grenade explosion.
Eduard Steinberg, 76, Russian painter, cancer. 
Neil Travis, 75, American film editor (Dances with Wolves, Stepmom, Terminator 3: Rise of the Machines), Oscar winner (1991).
Addie L. Wyatt, 88, American labor and civil rights leader, long illness.

29
Mortimer H. Appley, 90, American psychologist and academic administrator.
P. S. Appu, 83, Indian civil servant.
Luke Askew, 80, American actor (Cool Hand Luke, Easy Rider, The Green Berets).
Ioannis Banias, 72, Greek politician.
Borgia, 18, German racehorse, euthanized.
Jonathan Bowden, 49, British politician.
William Brett, Baron Brett, 70, British trade unionist and politician.
Liv Buck, 83, Norwegian trade unionist. 
 Olimpia Cavalli, 81, Italian actress (Vanina Vanini, The Thursday, His Women). 
John S. Chase, 87, American architect.
Pap Cheyassin Secka, 69, Gambian politician.
Paulino Reale Chirina, 88, Argentine Roman Catholic prelate, Bishop of Venado Tuerto (1989–2000).
Gerald Estrin, 90, American computer science pioneer.
Albert Hadley, 91, American interior decorator, cancer.
Bill Jenkins, 81, American NHRA drag racer.
Hone Kaa, 71, New Zealand church leader, cancer.
Kenneth Libo, 74, American historian of Jewish immigration.
Oksana Makar, 18, Ukrainian rape and murder victim.
John Mallison, 82, Australian pastor.
Montjeu, 16, Irish racehorse, sepsis.
Ray Narleski, 83, American baseball player (Cleveland Indians), natural causes.
Joel Olson, 45, American political science professor.
Michael Peterson, 59, Australian surfer, heart attack.
David Walter, 64, British journalist, cancer.

30
Janet Anderson Perkin, 90, Canadian baseball player and curler.
*Raja Ashman Shah, 53, Malaysian royal, son of the Sultan of Perak, asthma attack.
Rex Babin, 49, American cartoonist (The Sacramento Bee), cancer.
Robert Beezer, 83, American federal judge, lung cancer.
Jorge Carpizo McGregor, 67, Mexican jurist, complications from surgery.
James Chowning Davies, 93, American sociologist.
Ron Gaunt, 78, Australian cricketer.
Kees Guyt, 58, Dutch footballer (AZ'67). 
Rich Jeffries, 73, American television announcer (The Price Is Right).
Aquila Berlas Kiani, 90–91, Indian academic.
Barry Kitchener, 64, English footballer (Millwall), cancer.
Viktor Kosichkin, 74, Russian Olympic speed skating gold and silver medalist (1960).
Francesco Mancini, 43, Italian footballer (Foggia), heart attack.
Addie Morrow, 83, Northern Irish politician.
Emrys Roberts, 82, Welsh poet and author, Archdruid of Wales (1987–1990).
Granville Semmes, 84, American entrepreneur, founder of 1-800-Flowers.
Leonid Shebarshin, 77, Russian KGB interim Chairman (1991), suicide.
Tenga Rinpoche, 80, Tibetan lama.
Yiannis Vasiliadis, 88, Greek politician and admiral, Minister of Public Order (1990–1991).
Erich Wenk, 86, German bass-baritone.

31
Judith Adams, 68, New Zealand-born Australian politician, Senator for Western Australia (since 2005), breast cancer.
Beatrice Brumby, 98, Australian pastoral and tourism pioneer.
G. Emerson Cole, 93, American radio broadcaster.
Dale R. Corson, 97, American physicist, President of Cornell University (1969–1977), heart failure.
Cosmas Desmond, 76, South African priest and activist.
Grand Slam, 17, American thoroughbred racehorse, winner of the 1997 Belmont Futurity Stakes and Champagne Stakes, heart failure.
Bernard Gruenke, 99, American stained glass artist.
Lise London, 96, French resistance fighter, widow of Artur London.
Jerry Lynch, 81, American baseball player (Pittsburgh Pirates, Cincinnati Reds), prostate cancer.
Galina Savenko, 46, Russian Olympic sprint canoer. 
Alberto Sughi, 83, Italian painter. 
Halbert White, 61, American economist, cancer.

References

2012-03
 03